The 1900 United States presidential election in Kansas took place on November 6, 1900. All contemporary 45 states were part of the 1900 United States presidential election. Kansas voters chose ten electors to the Electoral College, which selected the president and vice president.

Kansas was won by the Republican nominees, incumbent President William McKinley of Ohio and his running mate Theodore Roosevelt of New York. McKinley won the state by a margin of 6.60 percentage points. McKinley had previously lost the state to Democrat William Jennings Bryan four years earlier while Bryan would later lose the state again to another Republican (William Howard Taft) in 1908.

Results

Results by county

See also
 United States presidential elections in Kansas

Notes

References

Kansas
1900
1900 Kansas elections